Hatice Kübra Yangın (born August 15, 1989 in Kütahya) is a Turkish female taekwondo practitioner competing in the bantamweight division. She is a member of the Kocaeli BB Kağıt S.K. in Izmit.

She began with taekwondo at the age of 13 in Eskişehir, where her father is an employee of the province's sports office. Her sister Gamze is also a national taekwondo practitioner.

Hatice Kübra Yangın became champion at the 2008 European Taekwondo Championships. She won a bronze medal at the 2011 World Taekwondo Championships held in Gyeongju, South Korea. The same year Yangın won the gold medal at the 2011 Summer Universiade. In 2012, she regained her champion title at the 2012 European Taekwondo Championships.

Achievements

References

1989 births
People from Kütahya
Turkish female taekwondo practitioners
Living people
Turkish female martial artists
Kocaeli Büyükşehir Belediyesi Kağıt Spor athletes
European Games competitors for Turkey
Universiade medalists in taekwondo
Universiade gold medalists for Turkey
Taekwondo practitioners at the 2015 European Games
World Taekwondo Championships medalists
European Taekwondo Championships medalists
Medalists at the 2011 Summer Universiade
20th-century Turkish sportswomen
21st-century Turkish sportswomen